The Fort Hays State Tigers football program is a college football team that represents Fort Hays State University in the Mid-America Intercollegiate Athletics Association, a part of NCAA Division II. The team has had 23 head coaches since its first recorded football game in 1902.  After it was announced that head coach Kevin Verdugo would not return for the 2011 season,  Chris Brown was announced as the new head coach.

Wayne J. McConnell coached the most games for the school, 155 games total from 1956 through 1968. One year coach Andrew Frank Schoeppel went on to become the 29th Governor of Kansas from 1943 to 1947 and a U.S. Senator from 1949 until his death. Jim Gilstrap went on to a successful coaching career in the Canadian Football League.

Key

Coaches
Statistics correct as of the end of the 2022 season.

See also
 List of lists of people from Kansas

Notes

References

Lists of college football head coaches

Kansas sports-related lists